Mbella Sonne Dipoko (February 28, 1936 in Douala – December 5, 2009 in Tiko) was a novelist, poet and painter from Cameroon. He is widely considered to be one of the foremost writers of literature in English from Cameroon.

Early life 
Mbella Sonne Dipoko was born to Paul Sonne Dipoko, who was the Chief of Missaka. Mbella took over as Chief of Missaka after his father died in 1990. As a young man, he worked for the Cameroon Development Corporation as an accounts clerk in the year 1956. The following year, 1957, he started working as a reporter for the Nigerian Broadcasting Corporation. He stayed with the Nigerian Broadcasting Corporation until the year 1968. During this period of employment with the Nigerian Broadcasting Corporation,  he served as their reporter from France.  In the year 1960 he started further studies in Paris, at the age of 24. For a couple of years, he studied Law and Economics at Université de Paris, and then abandoned his studies to pursue his interest in writing. It was during this time when he was studying in Paris that he began his writing career. His first piece of writing was the novel A Few Nights and Days, which was published in the year 1966. That same year, he also wrote the piece "Helping the Revolution: a story", which was set in apartheid-era South Africa. After publishing his third novel, he returned to university in America, where he studied and earned a degree in Anglo-American studies, majoring in English.

Major works
 A Few Nights and Days. London: Longman, 1966.
 Because of Women. London: Heinemann Educational Books, 1969. African Writers Series, 57.
 Black and White in Love. London: Heinemann Educational Books, 1972. African Writers Series, 107.

Other works 

 Helping the Revolution: a story. The New African, 1966
 Inheritors of The Mungo. Présence Africaine, 1971
My People. Présence Africaine, 1970
Overseas. African Arts, 1970
Palabres. Présence Africaine, 1967
Pris au piège. Présence Africaine, 1962
Our Life. Transition, 1963
Creative Hope. Transition, 1962
Transient Might. Transition, 1962
Promise. Transition, 1962
Cultural Diplomacy in African Writing. Africa Today, 1968
The First Return. Présence Africaine, 1967
Be a Guide. Transition, 1964 
Mass Exile. Transition, 1964
Racism and the Eloquence of May. Présence Africaine, 1968
To Pre-Colonial Africa.  Transition, 1964
Our Destiny. Transition, 1964
Progress. Présence Africaine, 1966
Marching through marshes.  Présence Africaine, 1963

References

1936 births
2009 deaths
Cameroonian painters
Cameroonian poets
Male poets
Cameroonian novelists
Male novelists
20th-century Cameroonian painters
20th-century poets
20th-century novelists
People from Douala
Cameroonian male writers
20th-century male writers